1975 Soviet Second League was a Soviet competition in the Soviet Second League.

Qualifying groups

Group I [Caucasus and Soviet Turkestan]

Group II [Centre and Northwest]

Group III [Russian South]

Group IV [Volga–Ural]

Group V [Kazakhstan and Siberia]

Group VI (Ukraine)

Promotion playoffs

Semifinal group 1 
 [Riga]

Semifinal group 2 
 [Ashkhabad]

Semifinal group 3 
 [Makhachkala]

Final group 
 [Chimkent]

References
 All-Soviet Archive Site
 Results. RSSSF

Soviet Second League seasons
3
Soviet
Soviet